Lascano is a small town in the Rocha Department of southeastern Uruguay.

Geography
The town is located at the junction of Route 15 with Route 14,  from rio Cebollatí which is the border with Lavalleja Department.

History

A village was first founded in the fields of ranchers Don Francisco Fernández and Don Francisco Lascano, by decree of 10 February 1876. The estates were situated on what was called until then "Partido de las Tres Islas". Although Don Lascano had a much smaller portion of land, the village used the name as it was on the signed official papers. Don Fernández's illiteracy also eliminated his claim to the name. In 1880 it became part of the newly formed Rocha Department.

On 4 July 1908, its status was elevated to "Villa" (town) by the Act of Ley N° 3.304 and on 3 November 1952 to "Ciudad" (city) by the Act of Ley N° 11.874.

Population
In 2011 Lascano had a population of 7,645.
 
Source: Instituto Nacional de Estadística de Uruguay

Notable people 
Artigas Barrios, politician
Carlos Julio Eizmendi, violinist
Adauto Puñales, politician
Yeanneth Puñales, writer and politician
Javier Gerard, famous rabbi

References

External links
INE map of Lascano
Lascanoweb

Populated places in the Rocha Department